David Allen Pool (born December 20, 1966) is a former American football defensive back in the National Football League who played for the Buffalo Bills, New England Patriots, and Miami Dolphins. He played college football for the Tennessee State Tigers and Carson–Newman Eagles.

References

1966 births
Living people
American football defensive backs
Buffalo Bills players
New England Patriots players
Miami Dolphins players
Tennessee State Tigers football players
Carson–Newman Eagles football players